Wiwi-Anne Johansson (born 1950) is a Swedish Left Party politician. She has been a member of the Riksdag since 2006.

External links
Wiwi-Anne Johansson at the Riksdag website

Members of the Riksdag from the Left Party (Sweden)
Living people
1950 births
Women members of the Riksdag
21st-century Swedish women politicians
Members of the Riksdag 2006–2010
Members of the Riksdag 2010–2014